Stéphanie St-Pierre (born August 2, 1985) is a Canadian freestyle skier. St-Pierre competes in moguls.

Born in Victoriaville, Quebec, St-Pierre  made her World Cup debut in January 2002 at Tignes. Her first World Cup podium came at Fernie, British Columbia in 2003, where she won a dual moguls event.

Over her career, St-Pierre has earned eight podium places at World Cup events, with two of these being victories. Her most successful season came in 2007, when she placed 5th overall in the World Cup standings. She also won a bronze medal at the 2003 World Championships in Deer Valley.

St-Pierre competed at the 2006 Winter Olympics. She finished 17th in the opening round of the women's moguls, good enough to advance in the final. In the final, she improved her score to end up 12th overall.

World Cup podiums

References

External links
 FIS profile
 

1985 births
French Quebecers
Living people
Olympic freestyle skiers of Canada
Freestyle skiers at the 2006 Winter Olympics
People from Victoriaville
Canadian female freestyle skiers
Sportspeople from Quebec